The Montenegrin Orthodox Church is a non-canonical eastern-orthodox church in Montenegro, created in 1993.

Montenegrin Orthodox Church may also refer to:
 Montenegrin Orthodox Church (2018), another non-canonical eastern-orthodox church in Montenegro, created in 2018
 Serbian Orthodox Church in Montenegro, canonical branch of the Serbian Orthodox Church in Montenegro

See also 
 Montenegrin Church (disambiguation)
 Serbian Orthodox Church (disambiguation)
 Serbian Church (disambiguation)